Mohammed Harris Akbar is an English amateur boxer who won a gold medal at the 2022 European Championships.

References

External links
Harris Akbar at GB Boxing

Living people
Year of birth missing (living people)
Date of birth missing (living people)
English male boxers
Sportspeople from Bradford